= IFPI Danmark =

Music certification and sales chart provider for Denmark

IFPI Danmark is the Danish branch of the International Federation of the Phonographic Industry (IFPI) and is the official charts provider and recording sales certification body for Denmark.

== Certification ==
Gold and platinum awards were first awarded in Denmark in the early 1990s. The sales requirements are the same for domestic and international repertoire. Danish certification system for music products are awarded based on shipments.

=== Albums ===
Certification	Before 1994	Since 1994	Since April 2003^{†}	Since February 1, 2007^{†}	Since January 7, 2011^{†}
Gold	50,000	25,000	20,000	15,000	10,000
Platinum	80,000	50,000	40,000	30,000	20,000

^{†} Sales can include digital downloads and also streams at a ratio of 1:1000

=== Singles ===
Certification	Before February 2007	Since February 1, 2007^{‡}	Since April, 2009^{‡}	Since November 17, 2014^{‡}	Since April 1, 2016^{‡}
Gold	4,000	7,500	15,000	30,000	45,000
Platinum	8,000	15,000	30,000	60,000	90,000

^{‡} Sales can include digital downloads and also streams at a ratio of 1:100

Streaming only

Certification Streaming instituted on January 7, 2011	Before January 30, 2012	Since January 30, 2012	Since April 30, 2012	Since March 21, 2014	Since November 17, 2014
Gold	50,000	450,000	900,000	1,300,000	The Streaming is included in Downloads
Platinum	100,000	900,000	1,800,000	2,600,000	The Streaming is included in Downloads

=== DVDs ===
Video-single DVDs

Certification	Since 2007
Gold	7,500
Platinum	15,000

Full-length DVDs

Certifications	Before February 2007	Since February 2007	Since January 7, 2011
Gold	20,000	15,000	10,000
Platinum	40,000	30,000	20,000
